Veronicella is a genus of tropical air-breathing land slugs in the family Veronicellidae, the leatherleaf slugs.

V. cubensis and V. sloanii are known as agricultural pests.

Species
Species within the genus Veronicella include:
 Veronicella cubensis (Pfeiffer, 1840) – Cuban slug
 Veronicella portoricensis (Semper, 1886)
 Veronicella sloanei (Cuvier, 1817) (orth. var. Veronicella sloanii) – pancake slug
 Veronicella tenax Baker, 1931
 Veronicella sp. from Dominica - an as yet undescribed species

Gallery

References 

Veronicellidae